Cytisopsis is a genus of flowering plants in the legume family, Fabaceae. It belongs to the subfamily Faboideae.

Species in this genus include: 

 Cytisopsis dorycniifolia
 Cytisopsis pseudocytisus, an ingredient in the herbal tea, zahraa, in the Unani medicine tradition of Syria.

References 

Loteae
Fabaceae genera